Jumária Barbosa de Santana (born 8 May 1979), commonly known as Jumária, is a Brazilian professional footballer who plays as a midfielder for Série A2 club EC Bahia.

On 5 October 2017, FIFA declared Jumária and other nine Brazilian footballers ineligible to play for Equatorial Guinea.

Honors and awards

National team
Equatorial Guinea
Africa Women Cup of Nations: 2008, 2012

References

External links 
 

1979 births
Living people
Sportspeople from Salvador, Bahia
Brazilian women's footballers
Women's association football midfielders
Campeonato Brasileiro de Futebol Feminino Série A1 players

Equatorial Guinea women's international footballers
2011 FIFA Women's World Cup players